Estadio 12 de Octubre is a stadium in Ensenada, Greater Buenos Aires. It is used for football matches and is the home stadium of Defensores de Cambaceres.

References

12